The 1980 Tulane Green Wave football team represented Tulane University in the 1980 NCAA Division I-A football season. The team was led by first-year coach Vince Gibson.  The Green Wave played home games in the Louisiana Superdome and finished with a 7–5 record, losing to Arkansas 15–34 in the Hall of Fame Classic.  In the 78th edition of the Battle for the Flag, Tulane lost 7–24 to LSU.  Throughout the season the offense scored 279 points, while the defense allowed 243 points. Two members of the Green Wave team were drafted into the National Football League (NFL).

Schedule

Roster

Team players in the NFL

References

Tulane
Tulane Green Wave football seasons
Tulane Green Wave football